Paul Dolan (29 June 1927 – 19 September 1998) was an Irish sprinter. He competed in the men's 100 metres at the 1952 Summer Olympics.

Competition record

References

1927 births
1998 deaths
Athletes (track and field) at the 1948 Summer Olympics
Athletes (track and field) at the 1952 Summer Olympics
Irish male sprinters
Olympic athletes of Ireland